Shuravash may refer to:
 Shuravash-e Olya
 Shuravash-e Sofla